Alfred Peter Liebster (14 March 1910, Vienna – 2000, Camden, London, England) was a male former international table tennis player from Austria.

Table tennis career
From 1928 to 1938 he won sixteen medals in singles, doubles, and team events in the World Table Tennis Championships including two gold medals. The golds were won in the men's doubles with Robert Thum at the 1928 World Table Tennis Championships and in the men's team event at the 1936 World Table Tennis Championships.

He also won an English Open title.

See also
 List of table tennis players
 List of World Table Tennis Championships medalists

References

1910 births
2000 deaths
Austrian male table tennis players
Austrian emigrants to the United Kingdom